Ziauddin Ahmed was a war hero, freedom fighter and sub-sector commander under Sector 9 of Mukti Bahini during Bangladesh Liberation War in 1971.

Ziauddin was a witness in Bangabandhu assassination case. He took part in Day of Uprising of Soldier and People on November 7 in 1975.

Early life and education 
Ziaudding born at Parerhat village in Pirojpur district in 1950. His father Aftabuddin Ahmed was a chairman of Pirojpur municipality and founder of the then Pirojpur Awami League division.

Ziauddin Ahmed completed higher secondary certificate from Pirojpur Government Shaheed Suhrawardy College. He was the Pirojpur Sub-Division Chhatra Union president in 1968.

Career 
Ahmed was commissioned as a second lieutenant of the Pakistan Army in 1969. He was serving the army in the then West Pakistan when the Liberation War broke out in 1971.

Ahmed fled from Lahore, West Pakistan in July 1971 and joined the Liberation War thereafter. He was appointed as commander of Sundarbans sub-sector under sector 9. He commanded  the first East Bengal Regiment. He is reputed to have run the most disciplined force during the war.

Ziauddin was commissioned as a major of the Bangladesh Army in 1975. He was serving at the Directorate General of Forces Intelligence (DGFI) during the brutal bloodbath of August 15, 1975. After the assassination of Sheikh Mujibur Rahman he was relieved of his duty. Following the killing of Bangabandhu on August 15, Ziauddin joined the so-called Day of Uprising of Soldier and People (otherwise known as National Revolution and Solidarity Day) on November 7 the same year under the leadership of Col Taher.

Later, he stood for the Biplobi Sainik Sangshta (Revolutionary Sepoy's Organisation) in opposing the military rule and took shelter in the Sundarbans with his followers as part of the resistance. Ziaduddin was arrested in an army operation in the Sundarbans in 1976. Along with many other descanting military officials and political leaders, he was sentenced to life imprisonment by a military court. In 1980, he was freed on presidential clemency.

After 1975 he moved to Pirojpur and joined Jatiya Samajtantrik Dal. He started a non-political organisation "Banchao Sundarban" to protect the wildlife sanctuary of Sundarban. Ziauddin served as municipality chairman of Pirojpur municipality between 1989 and 1991. In 1996 he joined Awami League and was an advisor Awami League's Pirojpur unit.

To eliminate bandits from Sundarbans Ziauddin formed an organisation of fishermen named Dubla Fisherman Group of which he was also the chairman. He was injured during a gun battle with the forest's bandits in 2013.

Personal life 
Ziauddin Ahmed was a writer and a journalist. He married Kaniz Mahmuda and fathered four children. He was nicknamed the ‘Mukuthin Somrat’ (crownless king) of the Sundarbans.

Death 
He had been suffering from liver ailments since 2015. He died at Singapore's Mount Elizabeth Hospital on 28 July 2017. He was given State Honour by the Bangladesh Army. He was buried at his family graveyard at Parerhat Road in Pirojpur.

Authored book 
 Muktijuddhe Sundarban.

References 

Bangladesh Army officers
2017 deaths
People from Pirojpur District
Mukti Bahini personnel
1950 births